Taj Noor is an Indian film score and soundtrack composer, who has predominantly scored music for Tamil films.

Career
Taj Noor was born in town of Salem, Tamil Nadu to a district collector Usman Ali Khan and his wife Habibonisha and has two elder brothers and two elder sisters. He completed his education in Salem, attending the Bharatiya Vidyalaya and the Pavadi Boys High School and then continued his collegiate education at Government Arts College, Salem with Physics as his major subject. Taj Noor assisted music director A. R. Rahman, after joining his team in 1996. Initially, his major responsibility was to maintain all the back-ups for the work done by Rahman, with the job being particularly important before the technology boom in the late 1990s.

His first solo film soundtrack was for the romantic drama film, Aayiram Muthangaludan Thenmozhi (2012), though delays meant that the soundtrack albums of Pandiraj's Vamsam (2010) and Eththan (2011) released before hand. He also previously worked on the Rambha-starrer Vidiyum Varai Kaathiru, but the film was shelved. For Aayiram Muthangaludan Thenmozhi, Taj Noor composed the music based on the seasons in the Kurinji, Mullai, Marutham, Neithal and Palai regions and used mostly the violin, viola and cello to record the songs. The film's director, Shanmugaraj, was a good friend of Pandiraj and recommended that Taj Noor should be selected for Pandiraj's second venture. Taj Noor made a breakthrough in the music industry with the album of Vamsam, winning acclaim for his work, especially for the "Marudaani" song. He won further acclaim for his work in Eththan, though several of his subsequent albums had audio launches but did not have a theatrical release including Mallukattu, Adithalam, Swasame and Kaliyugam, where he worked alongside Siddharth Vipin and Arunagiri. Furthermore, other ventures saw him removed after beginning work such as Samuthirakani's Poraali (2011) or shelved midst production such as Ilankannan's Om, starring Arjun and Pallavi Subhash and the Sarathkumar-Iniya starrer Velachery.

Partial discography

Films

Television
Mudhal Mariyadhai - Kalaignar TV

References

Living people
Tamil film score composers
Indian male film score composers
Year of birth missing (living people)